The United States Canoe Association (USCA) is a 501(c)(3) non-profit organization devoted to canoeing and paddle sports within the United States. Established in 1968, it is headquartered in Lafayette, Indiana.

History 
USCA promotes and encourages the growth of paddling as a recognized competitive sport and beneficial recreational activity through educational and competitive programs.

Programs 
The USCA sanctions programs and events to promote paddlesport competition including its two marquee annual events; USCA National Canoe & Kayak Championship and the USCA Stock Aluminum & K-1 Downriver/Touring Championship.

Youth Cup 
The USCA sponsors a youth cup named after one of its members Greg Barton. Barton won four canoeing medals at the Summer Olympics, including golds in the K-1 1000 m and K-2 1000 m events at the 1988 Summer Olympics in Seoul. He also won several medals at the ICF Canoe Sprint World Championships.

Publications 
The Association publishes a quarterly magazine, Canoe News, devoted to competition, recreational cruising and camping, water safety, construction and maintenance of equipment, and canoeing news in general. USCA also publishes a canoe safety brochure and a training safety video under the approval of the U.S. Coast Guard.

References

External links
 
Sports organizations established in 1968
Canoeing
Voluntown, Connecticut
Sports in Connecticut
Canoeing and kayaking organizations
1968 establishments in Connecticut

501(c)(3) organizations
Non-profit organizations based in Connecticut